Hello! Gandhe Sir is a Marathi movie released on 19 June 2010. Produced by Dnyaeshwar Govekar and directed by the duo, Sandeep – Sameer.

Cast 

The cast includes 
Bharat Jadhav as Gangya
Girish Oak as Mr. Gandhe & Others
 Deepali Pansare

Soundtrack
The music has been provided by Pravin Kuvar.

Track listing

References

External links 
  Movie Review  - movies.burrp.com
  Movie Review - glamsham.com
 Hello Gandhe Sir' is a mix of B'wood films - ibnlive.in.com

2010 films
2010s Marathi-language films